Desulfovibrio ferrireducens  is a psychrotolerant bacterium from the genus of Desulfovibrio which has been isolated from permanently cold sediments from Fjord in Svalbard.

References

External links
Type strain of Desulfovibrio ferrireducens at BacDive -  the Bacterial Diversity Metadatabase	

Bacteria described in 2006
Psychrophiles
Desulfovibrio